

Player statistics
Appearances for competitive matches only

|}

Goals

Allsvenskan

Svenska Cupen

Intertoto Cup

Friendlies

Competitions

Overall

Allsvenskan

League table

Matches

Svenska Cupen

1995–96

Group stage

1996–97

Preliminary rounds

UEFA Intertoto Cup

Group stage

Friendlies

References

Djurgårdens IF Fotboll seasons
Djurgarden